The 1998–99 Pittsburgh Panthers men's basketball team represented the University of Pittsburgh in the 1998–99 NCAA Division I men's basketball season. Led by head coach Ralph Willard, the Panthers finished with a record of 14–16.

References

Pittsburgh Panthers men's basketball seasons
Pittsburgh
Pittsburgh Pan
Pittsburgh Pan